Evan Jones (born May 4) known professionally as Eazy the Phoenix or E&J is an American independent rapper from Miami, Florida. He is best known for his work with Jim Johnston of WWE Music Group on Ezekiel Jackson's professional wrestling theme song, "Domination".

Career
In 2009, Jones started uploading videos of himself freestyling to the online video sharing platform, YouTube in association with "Get Money Nation" under the username Mr. Get Money Nation, where he'd refer to himself as "E&J". Jones uploaded his first video to the account was on September 3, 2009. Later on in that year, Jones started working with Jim Johnston of WWE Music Group on his first track, "About to Get Raw" which was used by the Raw guest host, Shaquille O'Neal which aired on July 27, 2009, live on the USA Network. Jones then collaborated on another track with WWE Music Group, for WWE professional wrestler, Ezekiel Jackson on his theme song, "Domination" which was released on WWE The Music: A New Day, Vol. 10 on January 28, 2010. "Domination" was also released as a single track on June 1, 2011.

In 2012, Jones uploaded his last video to the Mr. Get Money Nation YouTube account on February 17, 2012, in the video, Jones was freestyling at the Brooklyn Bridge. Jones started uploading travel videos for a short period of time in 2014 under the username "Eazy Travel", which he stopped uploading to later on in the year. Jones now goes under the stage name Eazy the Phoenix on social media and his online freestyle work, where he uploads his raps, freestyles and music videos.

Discography

As featured artist

External links
 Eazy The Phoenix on YouTube

References

American hip hop singers
American male rappers
Living people
21st-century American rappers
21st-century American male musicians
Year of birth missing (living people)